Sidi Khaled District is a district of Biskra Province, Algeria.

Municipalities
The district has 3 municipalities:
Sidi Khaled
Ouled Harkat
Ouled Sassi

Districts of Biskra Province